Nederwetten en Eckart was a municipality in the Dutch province of North Brabant. It included the villages of Nederwetten and Eckart, the latter of which no longer exists; it is now a part of Eindhoven.

The municipality existed until 1821. In that year, Nederwetten became part of the municipality of Nuenen, Gerwen en Nederwetten, and Eckart merged with Woensel.

References

Former municipalities of North Brabant
Nuenen, Gerwen en Nederwetten